Lyudmila Stepanovna Buldakova (May 25, 1938 – November 7, 2006) was a Soviet and Russian volleyball player.

Buldakova had a long career in the Soviet national team, from 1955 through 1972, serving as the team captain in the last few years. At that time, the Soviet Union and Japan were the dominant nations in women's volleyball, and Buldakova and her team captured many titles. At the World Championships, she won the title in 1956, 1960 and 1970, while placing second in 1962 (the USSR boycotted the 1967 edition). The Soviet Union placed second behind Japan in the sport's Olympic debut in 1964, but then went on to win the gold in 1968 and 1972. Buldakova also became European Champion in 1958, 1967 and 1971, placing second in 1955, while missing the 1963 edition (which was won by the Soviet Union). In club play, Buldakova first played for Zalgiris Kaunas, before moving to Dynamo Moskva. With them, she won five USSR titles, and eight European Cups. After her retirement in 1975, she continued to be involved in volleyball as a children's coach.

The , named after her, is the prize for the Russian Women's Volleyball Super League best player, created by the Russian Volleyball Federation after her death.

She became an inductee of the Volleyball Hall of Fame in 2012.

References 

1938 births
2006 deaths
Sportspeople from Saint Petersburg
Honoured Masters of Sport of the USSR
Recipients of the Order of the Red Banner of Labour
Olympic volleyball players of the Soviet Union
Russian women's volleyball players
Soviet women's volleyball players
Volleyball players at the 1964 Summer Olympics
Volleyball players at the 1968 Summer Olympics
Volleyball players at the 1972 Summer Olympics
Olympic gold medalists for the Soviet Union
Olympic silver medalists for the Soviet Union
Olympic medalists in volleyball
Medalists at the 1972 Summer Olympics
Medalists at the 1968 Summer Olympics
Medalists at the 1964 Summer Olympics